Dwarf Mountain Alphabet is an album by Joy Electric. This album was self-produced by Ronnie Martin after a successful Kickstarter campaign after a break with Tooth & Nail Records.

Track 8 is a cover version of Sing Once For Me from an earlier Joy Electric album, The White Songbook. This version uses alternate lyrics during the verses.

Track listing
 "And This No More" - 3:54
 "Whose Voice Will Not Be Heard" - 3:53
 "Let the Past Go" - 3:40
 "Stark Obscurity" - 4:02
 "That Which Cannot Be Contained" - 3:22
 "Light Has Lost Its Presence Here" - 2:57
 "Further Into Light" - 3:55
 "Sing Once For Me" - 3:57
 "Sorrow Shall Find You" - 3:42
 "Notes From a Chapter" - 3:01

Credits
Ronnie Martin – Lyrics and vocals, Analog synthesizer
Adam Boose - Mastering
Amanda Louise Spayd - Album art

References

2012 albums
Joy Electric albums
Kickstarter-funded albums